The 1991 Trans America Athletic Conference baseball tournament was held at Conrad Park on the campus of Stetson University in DeLand, Florida. This was the thirteenth tournament championship held by the Trans America Athletic Conference, in its thirteenth year of existence.  won their first tournament championship in their first year in the conference and earned the conference's automatic bid to the 1991 NCAA Division I baseball tournament.

Format and seeding 
The top two finishers from each division by conference winning percentage qualified for the tournament, with the top seed from one division playing the second seed from the opposite in the first round.

Bracket

All-Tournament Team 
The following players were named to the All-Tournament Team.

Most Valuable Player 
Kevin Lucero was named Tournament Most Valuable Player. Lucero was a pitcher for FIU.

References 

Tournament
ASUN Conference Baseball Tournament
Trans America Athletic Conference baseball tournament